The Association for Behavior Analysis International (ABAI) is a nonprofit organization dedicated to promoting behavior analysis. The organization has over 9,000 members. The group organizes conferences and publishes journals on the topic of applied behavior analysis (ABA). ABAI has issued detailed, specific position papers intended to guide practitioners of ABA. The ABAI publishes six scholarly journals including The Psychological Record and their primary organ, Perspectives on Behavior Science, formerly The Behavior Analyst. They also publish an informational journal, Education and Treatment of Children, describing practical treatment of children with behavioral problems.

ABAI has been criticized for its connections to the Judge Rotenberg Center (JRC), a school that has been condemned by the United Nations for torture. According to the Autistic Self Advocacy Network (ASAN), ABAI has endorsed the methods of the JRC, including its use of the Graduated Electronic Decelerator, a device that delivers painful electric skin shocks, by allowing them to present at ABAI's annual conferences. ABAI has honored Robert A. Sherman for his legal defense of the JRC's use of aversive punishments on its students. In 2022, ABAI's membership voted to support a position that strongly opposed contingent electric skin shock.

History
The Association for Behavior Analysis International (ABAI) was founded in 1974 as the MidWestern Association for Behavior Analysis (MABA) to serve as an interdisciplinary group of professionals, paraprofessionals, and students. The first annual conference was a response by a group of behavior analysts who were having problems presenting their work at psychology conferences and other related events.  Some of the members included Sidney Bijou, James Dinsmoor, Bill Hopkins, and Roger Ulrich. The first headquarters were located on the campus of Western Michigan University (WMU) in Kalamazoo, Michigan. The association changed its name to the Association for Behavior Analysis in 1979. In 2002, the headquarters were moved off WMU's campus. In 2008, the association relocated to nearby Portage, Michigan (where it is today), and added "International" to its name. ABAI has more than 9,000 members and 28,000 affiliate members .

Activities and positions

Conferences 
ABAI organizes various conferences related to the practice and promotion of behavior analysis. Every two years, ABAI hosts an international conference. The association also holds an annual autism conference, and an annual conference dedicated to the advancements of behavior analysis. Additionally, ABAI has hosted many single-track conferences on topics of special interest to behavior analysts, such as theory and philosophy, climate change, behavioral economics, and education. The Judge Rotenberg Center has attended some ABAI conferences to promote their organization, which has been condemned by the United Nations as having used methods which have been classified as torture.

Journals 

The Association of Applied Behavior Analysis International publishes four journals about behavior analysis various subjects of behavior analysis:
 The Analysis of Verbal Behavior is a collection of experiments and theoretical papers regarding verbal behavior and applied behavior analysis.
 Behavior Analysis in Practice is a peer-reviewed journal that includes articles on how to efficiently practice applied behavior analysis. 
 Perspectives on Behavior Science (previously The Behavior Analyst) is a journal that includes literary reviews, reinterpretations of published data, theoretical and experimental articles, and articles that discuss behaviorism as a philosophy.
 The Psychological Record includes articles concerning behavioral analysis, behavioral science, and behavior theory. It was founded in 1937 by Jacob Robert Kantor.
Behavior and Social Issues
Education and Treatment of Children

Position Statements 
ABAI has published seven position statements which are nominated and voted on by membership. These include:

 Position Statement on the Use of CESS, 2022 
 Statement on Conversion Therapy and Practices, 2022
 Expression of Support for the Asian-American Pacific Islander Community, 2021
 Commitment of Equity, 2020 
 Restraint and Seclusion, 2010
 Facilitated Communication, 1995 
 Students' Rights to Effective Education, 1990 
 Right to Effective Behavioral Treatment, 1989 

Peter Sturmey suggests in his chapter on Ethics that practitioners use these statements to guide their practice.

The Society for the Advancement of Behavior Analysis (SABA) provides financial support for ABAI activities and serve as a clearinghouse for outside funding of ABAI activities.

Awards
Through the sister organization of SABA, several categories of awards are given to individuals, organizations, and ABA research during the ABAI annual convention.

As of 2022, they offer 5 awards:

 The Distinguished Service to Behavior Analysis 
 The Scientific Translation 
 The International Dissemination of Behavior Analysis
 The Effective Presentation of Behavior Analysis in the Mass Media 
 The Enduring Programmatic Contributions in Behavior Analysis

Controversy 

One activist group, Autistic Self Advocacy Network (ASAN),  has published critical blog posts about The Association for Behavior Analysis International, suggesting that it provides a platform for the Judge Rotenberg Center (JRC), a controversial school which uses aversives. Specifically, the ASAN president Ari Ne'eman reviewed two books for Vox in which he criticized both the Autism Society of America and ABAI for not prohibiting the employees of JRC to submit presentations while it was concurrently under investigation from the Food and Drug Administration, the United States Department of Justice, and the United Nations Special Rapporteur on Torture.

In 1987, it gave the lawyer, Robert Sherman, the Humanitarian Award for the Right to Effective Treatment for winning a case that guaranteed the Judge Rotenberg Center the right to continue using aversives on its students. According to the ASAN, ABAI has endorsed the Judge Rotenberg Center's use of the Graduated Electronic Decelerator, an aversive device that administers painful electric shocks and has been condemned by the United Nations as torture, by allowing them to present at their annual conferences. 

The Therapist Neurodiversity Collective made a statement about ABAI's connection to the JRC: "We are appalled and horrified that the Association for Behavior Analysis International (ABAI) chooses to condone painful electric shock aversion therapy at the Judge Rotenberg Center, which the United Nations Special Rapporteur on Torture has condemned. We are horrified that the JRC will continue the fight to be allowed to continue torturing human beings."

In 2022, ABAI's membership voted to support a position that strongly opposed contingent electric skin shock.

See also
 Behavior analysis of child development
 Society for the Experimental Analysis of Behavior

References

External links
 Association for Behavior Analysis International homepage

Behavioural sciences
Kalamazoo, Michigan
Psychology organizations based in the United States
Behaviorism